Frühauf or Fruhauf is a German-language surname. Notable people with this surname include:

 Aline Fruhauf (1907–1978), American caricaturist and painter
 Peter Frühauf (1982), Slovak former professional ice hockey defenceman
 Tina Frühauf (1972), German-American musicologist
 Herman Fruhauf Fruhauf Uniforms of Wichita, KS are the only multi-generational, family-owned, band uniform manufacturer in the country.

See also
 Spaeth

References

Surnames from nicknames